Canobie Lake is a  body of water located in Rockingham County in southern New Hampshire, United States, in the towns of Salem and Windham. Canobie Lake Park, an amusement park, is located on the lake's east shore. The lake is the water supply for the town of Salem, New Hampshire.

Canobie Lake is predominantly spring-fed. Aside from the amusement park, the shores of the lake are primarily lined with houses. Water from the lake flows via Policy Brook to the Spicket River and thence to the Merrimack River in Lawrence, Massachusetts.

The lake is classified as a warmwater fishery, with observed species including largemouth bass, smallmouth bass, chain pickerel, brown bullhead, black crappie, rainbow trout, brook trout, bluegill, and pumpkinseed.

See also

List of lakes in New Hampshire
Canobie Lake Park

References

Lakes of Rockingham County, New Hampshire
New Hampshire placenames of Native American origin